Avard was a town in Woods County, Oklahoma, United States.  The town is southwest of Alva, and northeast of Waynoka.  The population was 26 at the 2000 census and is sometimes considered a ghost town.  After initial growth Avard began declining in the 1930s.  Avard had a post office from June 1, 1895, until November 22, 1963. As of the 2010 census, Avard was listed as disincorporated.

History
The post office was first established in Avard in 1895 and the town was incorporated in 1904 when the Frisco tracks were extended westward from Enid to tie in with the Santa Fe.  The town was named for Isabell Avard Todd, the wife of Robert Todd.  The town was served by the Southern Arkansas Railway (Santa Fe) and Arkansas Valley and Western Railroad (Frisco).

Avard had mercantile establishments, two hotels, a bank, a livestock auction, and an elevator.   A weekly newspaper, the Avard Tribune operated from 1904 to 1918.  It was a major cattle shipping point for the area.

A total of 250 people lived in the town in 1909.

It was an important rail transfer point for freight and passengers from 1910 to 1930.  

Avard continued to grow until the mid-1930s. During this period the town declined due to the economic depression, dust storms, farm consolidation, and changing travel habits. Additionally, the town was struck by tornadoes in 1943 and 1944.

Today, only an elevator and church are left in operation. There are also a few unused store buildings.

But the town still has important rail connections.  It is the location of the Avard Regional Industrial Rail Park, which is a rail-served industrial park given site-certification by the BNSF Railway to ensure the location is ready for rapid development.

Geography
Avard is located at  (36.699116, -98.790078).

Demographics

As of the census of 2000, there were 26 people, 13 households, and 6 families residing in the town. The population density was 126.7 people per square mile (47.8/km2). There were 17 housing units at an average density of 82.8 per square mile (31.3/km2). The racial makeup of the town was 96.15% White, and 3.85% from two or more races.

There were 13 households, out of which 30.8% had children under the age of 18 living with them, 46.2% were married couples living together, and 53.8% were non-families. 46.2% of all households were made up of individuals, and 15.4% had someone living alone who was 65 years of age or older. The average household size was 2.00 and the average family size was 3.00.

In the town, the population was spread out, with 19.2% under the age of 18, 7.7% from 18 to 24, 26.9% from 25 to 44, 26.9% from 45 to 64, and 19.2% who were 65 years of age or older. The median age was 42 years. For every 100 females, there were 116.7 males. For every 100 females age 18 and over, there were 110.0 males.

The median income for a household in the town was $23,750, and the median income for a family was $40,000. Males had a median income of $23,750 versus $14,583 for females. The per capita income for the town was $11,757. There were no families and 17.1% of the population living below the poverty line, including no under eighteens and 50.0% of those over 64.

References

External links
 Avard - Encyclopedia of Oklahoma History and Culture
 Oklahoma Digital Maps: Digital Collections of Oklahoma and Indian Territory

Ghost towns in Oklahoma
Unincorporated communities in Woods County, Oklahoma
Unincorporated communities in Oklahoma